In addition to the televised episodes of Doctor Who starring Patrick Troughton, the Second Doctor has appeared in a number of spin-off media.

Audio dramas
Fear of the Daleks (an adventure related by the character Zoe) (2007)
Helicon Prime (an adventure related by the character Jamie) (2007)
The Great Space Elevator (an adventure related by the character Victoria) (2008)
Resistance (an adventure related by the character Polly) (2009)
The Glorious Revolution (an adventure related by the character Jamie) (2009)
The Three Companions (an adventure related by the character Polly)
The Emperor of Eternity (an adventure related by the characters Jamie & Victoria) (2010)
Echoes of Grey (an adventure related by the character Zoe) (2010)
Prison in Space (an adventure related by the characters Jamie & Zoe) (2010)
The Forbidden Time (an adventure related by the characters Polly & Jamie) (2011)
Tales from the Vault (a short adventure related by the character Zoe) (2011)
The Memory Cheats (an adventure related by the character Zoe) (2011)
The Rosemariners (an adventure related by the characters Jamie & Zoe) (2012)
The Selachian Gambit (an adventure related by the characters Polly & Jamie) (2012)The Jigsaw War (an adventure related by the character Jamie) (2012)The Uncertainty Principle (an adventure related by the character Zoe) (2012)Destiny of the Doctor: Shadow of Death (an adventure related by the character Jamie) (2013)The Light at the End (portrayed by Frazer Hines) (2013)House of Cards (an adventure related by the characters Polly & Jamie) (2013)The Apocalypse Mirror (an adventure related by the characters Jamie & Zoe) (2013)The Queen of Time (an adventure related by the characters Jamie & Zoe) (2013)Lords of the Red Planet (an adventure related by the characters Jamie & Zoe) (2013)The Dying Light (an adventure related by the characters Jamie & Zoe) (2013)Second Chances (an adventure related by the character Zoe) (2014)The Yes Men (an adventure related by the characters Polly, Ben & Jamie) (2015)The Forsaken (an adventure related by the characters Polly, Ben & Jamie) (2015)The Black Hole (an adventure related by the characters Jamie & Victoria) (2015)The Isos Network (an adventure related by the characters Jamie & Zoe) (2015)The Night's Witches (an adventure related by the characters Polly, Ben & Jamie) (2017)The Outliers (an adventure related by the characters Polly, Ben & Jamie) (2017)The Morton Legacy (an adventure related by the characters Polly, Ben & Jamie) (2017)The Wreck of the World (an adventure related by the characters Jamie & Zoe) (2017)

Short Trips audiosA Stain of Red in the SandThe Way ForwardSeven to OneThe Five Dimensional ManPenny Wise, Pound FoolishNovels and short stories
Virgin New AdventuresTimewyrm: Apocalypse by Nigel Robinson (brief flashback to the Second Doctor's era; the Seventh Doctor also interacts with his 'memory' of his second incarnation's personality, manifesting to him via the TARDIS telepathic circuits)

Virgin Missing AdventuresThe Menagerie by Martin DayInvasion of the Cat-People by Gary RussellTwilight of the Gods by Christopher BulisThe Dark Path by David A. McIntee

Past Doctor AdventuresThe Murder Game by Steve LyonsThe Roundheads by Mark GatissDreams of Empire by Justin RichardsThe Final Sanction by Steve LyonsHeart of TARDIS by Dave Stone (Also features the Fourth Doctor, although neither Doctor meets the other, each Doctor simply tackling a different end of the same crisis with only the Fourth aware of his other self's involvement)Independence Day by Peter Darvill-Evans (brief appearance only; predominately Seventh Doctor novel)Dying in the Sun by Jon de Burgh MillerCombat Rock by Mick LewisThe Colony of Lies by Colin Brake (brief interaction with the Seventh Doctor in a virtual reality)The Indestructible Man by Simon MessinghamWorld Game by Terrance Dicks (depicts a possible beginning for the 'Season 6B' theory)

Eighth Doctor AdventuresThe Eight Doctors by Terrance Dicks
 Seen in the TARDIS mirror in Camera ObscuraTelos Doctor Who novellas
 Foreign Devils by Andrew Cartmel
 Wonderland by Mark Chadbourn

BBC BooksThe Wheel of Ice by Stephen Baxter

Penguin Fiftieth Anniversary eBook novellas
 The Nameless City by Michael Scott

Comics

TV ComicThe Extortioners			 	The Trodos Ambush			 	The Doctor Strikes Back			The Zombies				 	Master of the Spiders		 		The Exterminator			 	The Monsters from the Past		 	The TARDIS Worshippers			Space War Two				 	Egyptian Escapade			 	The Coming of the Cybermen		 	The Faithful Rocket Pack		 	Flower Power					The Witches				 	Cyber-Mole				 	The Sabre Toothed Gorillas		 	The Cyber Empire			 	The Dyrons				 	Dr. Who and the Space Pirates			Car of the Century			 	The Jokers				 	Invasion of the Quarks			The Killer Wasps			 	Ice Cape Terror				Jungle of Doom			 		Father Time				 	Martha the Mechanical Housemaid		The Duellists		 			Eskimo Joe			 		Perils at 60 Fathoms			 	Operation Wurlitzer			 	Action in Exile				The Mark of Terror			 	The Brotherhood				U.F.O.						The Night WalkersTV Comic SpecialsBarnabus				 	Jungle Adventures			 	Return of the Witches		 		Masquerade				 	The Champion				 	The EntertainerTV Comic AnnualsAttack of the Daleks			 	Pursued by the Trods			 	The Time Museum		 		The Electrodes			 		Death Race				 	Test FlightDoctor Who MagazineLand of the BlindDoctor Who Magazine SpecialsBringer of DarknessIDW seriesThe Forgotten Prisoners of Time''

Non-televised Second Doctor stories